Osvaldo Roberto Suárez (March 17, 1934 in Wilde – 16 February 2018) was a long-distance runner from Argentina who won four gold medals at the Pan American Games. He was punished by the Revolución Libertadora (The Liberating Revolution) and blamed for receiving favors to travel (even being a famous and successful athlete), so he could not be at the 1956 Melbourne Olympic Games. After that, he represented his native country at two Summer Olympics, in 1960 and 1964. After retiring from his running career, he became a professional athletics coach.

References

  Interview
 sports-reference

1934 births
2018 deaths
Sportspeople from Buenos Aires Province
Argentine male long-distance runners
Athletes (track and field) at the 1955 Pan American Games
Athletes (track and field) at the 1959 Pan American Games
Athletes (track and field) at the 1960 Summer Olympics
Athletes (track and field) at the 1963 Pan American Games
Athletes (track and field) at the 1964 Summer Olympics
Athletes (track and field) at the 1967 Pan American Games
Pan American Games medalists in athletics (track and field)
Pan American Games gold medalists for Argentina
Pan American Games silver medalists for Argentina
Pan American Games bronze medalists for Argentina
Olympic athletes of Argentina
Medalists at the 1955 Pan American Games
Medalists at the 1959 Pan American Games
Medalists at the 1963 Pan American Games